Sama Layuca is a studio album by American jazz pianist McCoy Tyner, released in 1974 by Milestone Records. It was recorded on March 26, 27, and 28, 1974, featuring oboist/flautist John Stubblefield, alto saxophonist Gary Bartz, tenor saxophonist  Azar Lawrence, vibraphonist Bobby Hutcherson, bassist Buster Williams, drummer Billy Hart and percussionists Guilherme Franco and Mtume.

Critical reception 
Reviewing for The Village Voice in 1974, Robert Christgau said the album's best music "breathes with a lushness and lyricism that never cloys". He found the melodies, harmonies, and polyrhythms to be "sensuous without coming on about it" and felt that Tyner's minor flaws as a pianist, including "Tatumesque flourishes", are "less egregious in an ensemble setting like this one." In a retrospective review for AllMusic, Scott Yanow said that Tyner is "heard at the height of his powers throughout this rewarding set", which serves as "a strong example of McCoy Tyner's music".

Track listing
All songs composed by McCoy Tyner.

 "Sama Layuca" - 8:37
 "Above the Rainbow" - 3:02
 "La Cubaña" - 10:26
 "Desert Cry" - 4:57
 "Paradox" - 16:27

Personnel
McCoy Tyner - piano
John Stubblefield - oboe, flute
Gary Bartz - alto saxophone
Azar Lawrence - tenor saxophone, soprano saxophone
Bobby Hutcherson - vibes, marimba
Buster Williams - bass
Billy Hart - drums
Guilherme Franco - percussion
James Mtume - percussion

References

External links 
 

McCoy Tyner albums
1974 albums
Milestone Records albums
Albums produced by Orrin Keepnews